The Assyrian Progressive Nationalist Party is an Assyrian political party with the goal to revive the Assyrian nation in Iraq, for the Assyrian people. It was founded by Ashur Bit-Shlimon in 1990.

References

Assyrian nationalism
Assyrian political parties
Assyrians in Iraq
Nationalist parties in Asia
Political parties of minorities in Iraq